Fons van Wissen (21 March 19337 July 2015) was a Dutch football player.

Club career
Van Wissen made his senior debut at 15 years of age at local amateur side RKVVM and joined MVV Maastricht in 1951. He moved to PSV Eindhoven in 1958 and won the 1963 Eredivisie title with the club after beating Ajax 5-2 despite Van Wissen playing while injured. He skippered the team for two years.

He finished his career with Helmond Sport.

International career
He made his debut for the Netherlands in an April 1957 friendly match against Belgium and has earned a total of 30 caps, scoring 4 goals. He represented his country in 4 FIFA World Cup qualification matches.

His final international was an October 1964 FIFA World Cup qualification match against Albania. He decided to quit international football after being struck by poverty in Albania.

International goals

Scores and results list the Netherlands' goal tally first.

Retirement and death
After retiring, Van Wissen owned a sports shop in Eindhoven. He died in July 2015.

References

External links

1933 births
2015 deaths
People from Eijsden-Margraten
Association football midfielders
Dutch footballers
Netherlands international footballers
MVV Maastricht players
PSV Eindhoven players
Helmond Sport players
Footballers from Limburg (Netherlands)